James Connell may refer to:
James C. Connell (1897–1973), American federal judge 
James J. Connell (1939–1971), American naval aviator, recipient of the Navy Cross
James Connell (lawyer), human rights attorney

See also
Jim Connell (1852–1929), Irish political activist
James O'Connell (disambiguation)
Jimmy O'Connell (disambiguation)